The Convention for the Safeguarding of the Intangible Cultural Heritage is a UNESCO treaty adopted by the UNESCO General Conference on 17 October 2003.

The convention entered into force in 2006, after thirty instruments of ratification by UNESCO Member States. Romania was the 30th state, ratifying the agreement on 20 January 2006. As of October 2022, 180 states have ratified, approved or accepted the convention.

Content

Layout of the Convention
The Convention contains following provisions:

Purposes of the Convention

Unlike other UNESCO conventions, this convention begins with stating its purposes, which are;

Definition

Intangible cultural heritage refers to "traditions or living expressions inherited from our ancestors and passed on to our descendants, such as oral traditions, performing arts, social practices, rituals, festive events, knowledge and practices concerning nature and the universe or the knowledge and skills to produce traditional crafts". The Convention defines it as follows:

Function
The convention works on both national and international levels.
At the national level, State Parties are supposed to 'take necessary measures to ensure the safeguarding of the intangible cultural heritage present in its territory." These measures include identification of the intangible cultural heritage that exists in its territory, adoption of appropriate policies, promotion of education and so on. Besides, in taking these measures, each state parties must "endeavor to ensure the widest possible participation of communities, groups, and, where appropriate, individuals that create, maintain and transmit such heritage, and to involve them actively in its management".

At the international level, this Convention promotes international cooperation, which includes "the exchange of information and experience, joint initiatives, and the establishment of a mechanism of assistance" to other State Parties.

Lists

The Committee to the Convention publishes and keeps up to date two lists of intangible cultural heritage, which are
the Representative List of the Intangible Cultural Heritage of Humanity
the List of Intangible Cultural Heritage in Need of Urgent Safeguarding.

Intangible Cultural Heritage Fund

The Convention establishes Intangible Cultural Heritage Fund, the use of which is decided by the committee. The fund mainly consists of the contributions by State Parties and funds by the General Conference of UNESCO.

History

Precursors
One of the first international occasions that mentioned the preservation of 'intangible heritage' was the World Conference on Cultural Policies in Mexico City in 1982. This Conference defined cultural heritage as including "both tangible and intangible works through which the creativity of people finds expression," and asked UNESCO and Member States to take measures for protecting this kind of heritage.

In 1989, UNESCO adopted the Recommendation on the Safeguarding of Traditional Culture and Folklore as the first legal instrument towards the safeguarding of intangible cultural heritage. This Recommendation reflected the ideas of the earlier Conference in Mexico City. UNESCO conducted some promotional programs for raising awareness of this Recommendation, but was not very successful. However, in the late 1990s, there was a conference held for the assessment of this Recommendation, which pointed out some problems to be considered in drafting the convention. In this sense, this Recommendation served as an important step.

In 1997, UNESCO launched the program of Proclamation of the Masterpieces of the Oral and Intangible Heritage of Humanity, intending to raise awareness of the importance of intangible heritage. This program proclaimed a total of 90 masterpieces between 2001 and 2005, and caused the movement toward the convention.

Creation

According to the request of Member States, a preliminary study, undertaken by Director-General, on how could the safeguarding of intangible cultural heritage be conducted, recommended to create a new document that set an international standard.

In 2001, the General Conference adopted another instrument, Universal Declaration on Cultural Diversity, which also includes articles dealing with the preservation of "heritage in all forms". This declaration and its Action Plan presented basic idea of the coming convention and helped to develop it.

As a result of many meetings for two years, the draft Convention was brought into the General Conference and adopted in 2003.

Criticism

Intangible heritage 
The definition of intangible cultural heritage has been criticized as potentially incomplete and/or creating a "Pandora's box of difficulties". For example, in a 2004 article in Museum International, Richard Kurin says that because the Convention does not recognize cultural activities not compatible with international human rights instruments, some activities, such as female genital mutilation, that groups may themselves consider critical to their culture, are not eligible. Similarly, Kurin notes that since many group's culture is defined in opposition to other cultures, the requirement for "mutual respect" may leave out traditional songs and stories that glorify "empire, victorious kings, religious conversion, or alternatively resistance to perceived injustice, martyrdom and defeat". However, Kurin also notes that the definition can be more expansive than intended by its designers, who originally planned only to protect "traditional cultural activities". He says that it is robust enough to encompass more modern forms of culture, including things like "rap music, Australian cricket, modern dance, post-modernist architectural knowledge, and karaoke bars".

Richard Kurin has argued that dividing culture into individual units is inconsistent with modern academic views of cultures. Additionally, Michael Brown has argued that Convention's focus on cataloging is based on an outdated belief that listing the details of a culture has some connection to preservation of that culture. States are also encouraged to enact programs to safeguard intangible cultural heritages, though any such work must be done in cooperation with the local practitioners. This aspect has also been criticized, since it is unclear how a state can safeguard a cultural practice by force, particularly if there is insufficient interest from local practitioners.

See also

 UNESCO Intangible Cultural Heritage Lists

References

External links
Official website of the Convention for the Safeguarding of the Intangible Cultural Heritage
Text of the Convention for the Safeguarding of the Intangible Cultural Heritage
Operational Directives for the implementation of the Convention for the Safeguarding of the Intangible Heritage
Recommendation on the Safeguarding of Traditional Culture and Folklore

Traditions
UNESCO treaties
Art and culture treaties
International cultural heritage documents
Convention for the Safeguarding of the Intangible Cultural Heritage
Convention for the Safeguarding of the Intangible Cultural Heritage
Treaties of Afghanistan
Treaties of Albania
Treaties of Algeria
Treaties of Andorra
Treaties of Antigua and Barbuda
Treaties of Argentina
Treaties of Armenia
Treaties of Austria
Treaties of Azerbaijan
Treaties of the Bahamas
Treaties of Bahrain
Treaties of Bangladesh
Treaties of Barbados
Treaties of Belarus
Treaties of Belgium
Treaties of Belize
Treaties of Benin
Treaties of Bhutan
Treaties of Bolivia
Treaties of Bosnia and Herzegovina
Treaties of Botswana
Treaties of Brazil
Treaties of Brunei
Treaties of Bulgaria
Treaties of Burkina Faso
Treaties of Myanmar
Treaties of Burundi
Treaties of Cambodia
Treaties of Cameroon
Treaties of Cape Verde
Treaties of the Central African Republic
Treaties of Chad
Treaties of Chile
Treaties of the People's Republic of China
Treaties of Colombia
Treaties of the Comoros
Treaties of the Republic of the Congo
Treaties of the Cook Islands
Treaties of Costa Rica
Treaties of Ivory Coast
Treaties of Croatia
Treaties of Cuba
Treaties of Cyprus
Treaties of the Czech Republic
Treaties of the Democratic Republic of the Congo
Treaties of Denmark
Treaties of Djibouti
Treaties of Dominica
Treaties of the Dominican Republic
Treaties of East Timor
Treaties of Ecuador
Treaties of Egypt
Treaties of El Salvador
Treaties of Equatorial Guinea
Treaties of Eritrea
Treaties of Estonia
Treaties of Ethiopia
Treaties of Fiji
Treaties of Finland
Treaties of France
Treaties of Gabon
Treaties of the Gambia
Treaties of Georgia (country)
Treaties of Germany
Treaties of Ghana
Treaties of Greece
Treaties of Grenada
Treaties of Guatemala
Treaties of Guinea
Treaties of Guinea-Bissau
Treaties of Haiti
Treaties of Honduras
Treaties of Hungary
Treaties of Iceland
Treaties of India
Treaties of Indonesia
Treaties of Iran
Treaties of Iraq
Treaties of Ireland
Treaties of Italy
Treaties of Jamaica
Treaties of Japan
Treaties of Jordan
Treaties of Kazakhstan
Treaties of Kenya
Treaties of Kiribati
Treaties of North Korea
Treaties of South Korea
Treaties of Kyrgyzstan
Treaties of Laos
Treaties of Latvia
Treaties of Lebanon
Treaties of Lesotho
Treaties of Lithuania
Treaties of Luxembourg
Treaties of North Macedonia
Treaties of Madagascar
Treaties of Malawi
Treaties of Malaysia
Treaties of Mali
Treaties of Malta
Treaties of the Marshall Islands
Treaties of Mauritania
Treaties of Mauritius
Treaties of Mexico
Treaties of the Federated States of Micronesia
Treaties of Moldova
Treaties of Monaco
Treaties of Mongolia
Treaties of Montenegro
Treaties of Morocco
Treaties of Mozambique
Treaties of Namibia
Treaties of Nauru
Treaties of Nepal
Treaties of the Netherlands
Treaties of Nicaragua
Treaties of Niger
Treaties of Nigeria
Treaties of Norway
Treaties of Oman
Treaties of Pakistan
Treaties of Palau
Treaties of the State of Palestine
Treaties of Panama
Treaties of Papua New Guinea
Treaties of Paraguay
Treaties of Peru
Treaties of the Philippines
Treaties of Poland
Treaties of Portugal
Treaties of Qatar
Treaties of Romania
Treaties of Rwanda
Treaties of Saint Kitts and Nevis
Treaties of Saint Lucia
Treaties of Saint Vincent and the Grenadines
Treaties of Samoa
Treaties of São Tomé and Príncipe
Treaties of Saudi Arabia
Treaties of Senegal
Treaties of Serbia
Treaties of Seychelles
Treaties of Singapore
Treaties of Slovakia
Treaties of Slovenia
Treaties of the Solomon Islands
Treaties of Spain
Treaties of Sri Lanka
Treaties of the Republic of the Sudan (1985–2011)
Treaties of Suriname
Treaties of Eswatini
Treaties of Sweden
Treaties of Switzerland
Treaties of Syria
Treaties of Tajikistan
Treaties of Tanzania
Treaties of Thailand
Treaties of Togo
Treaties of Tonga
Treaties of Trinidad and Tobago
Treaties of Tunisia
Treaties of Turkey
Treaties of Turkmenistan
Treaties of Tuvalu
Treaties of Uganda
Treaties of Ukraine
Treaties of the United Arab Emirates
Treaties of Uruguay
Treaties of Uzbekistan
Treaties of Vanuatu
Treaties of Venezuela
Treaties of Vietnam
Treaties of Yemen
Treaties of Zambia
Treaties of Zimbabwe
2003 in France
Treaties extended to Aruba
Treaties extended to the Caribbean Netherlands
Treaties extended to Hong Kong